Glyfa may refer to the following places in Greece:

Glyfa, Paros, a village in the island of Paros, Cyclades
Glyfa, Elis, a village in the municipal unit Vartholomio, Elis
Glyfa, Phthiotis, a village in the municipal unit Pelasgia, Phthiotis